Bokashi (ぼかし) is Japanese for "shading off" or "gradation."  It may refer to:

 Bokashi (printing), a printing technique
 Bokashi gasuri, a dyeing technique for textiles
 Fogging (censorship), blurring an image as a form of censorship
 Bokashi (horticulture), an organic waste fermentation-process like silage
 Bokeh, an image effect related to Bokashi.